Gunkha is a small village in Botlikh district in Dagestan, Russia

Geographical location 
It is located 14 km northeast of the village Botlikh, on the left bank of the Unsatlen River.

Language 
The villagers speak the Andean language. In 1981, a linguistic expedition Department of Structural and Applied Linguistics of the Faculty of Philology MSU led by A. E. Kibrika.

Notes 

Rural localities in Botlikhsky District